Hartmut Bölts (born 14 June 1961) is a German former racing cyclist. In 1985 he won the Hessen-Rundfahrt. He won the German National Road Race in 1988. He also competed in the team time trial event at the 1984 Summer Olympics. He is the brother of fellow former cyclist Udo Bölts.

Major results

1983
 1st  Overall Flèche du Sud
 1st Stage 4 Circuit des Ardennes
 3rd Rund um Düren
1984
 6th Overall Tour de Luxembourg
1985
 1st  Overall Hessen-Rundfahrt
1986
 1st  Overall Ernst-Sachs-Tour
 3rd Overall Tour de Berlin
1987
 1st  National Amateur Road Race Championships
1988
 1st  National Road Race Championships
 4th Road race, World Road Championships
1990
 6th Overall Herald Sun Tour
1st Stage 8
1993
 1st Stage 8 Bayern Rundfahrt
1994
 1st Stage 5 Bayern Rundfahrt

References

External links
 

1961 births
Living people
People from Rodalben
German male cyclists
Cyclists from Rhineland-Palatinate
German cycling road race champions
Olympic cyclists of West Germany
Cyclists at the 1984 Summer Olympics
German mountain bikers
20th-century German people